Calciopoli was a sports scandal in Italy's top professional association football league Serie A and to a lesser extent Serie B. Involving various clubs and numerous executives, both from the same clubs and from the main Italian football bodies (FIGC, and LNP), as well as some referees and referee assistants, the scandal was uncovered in May 2006, when a number of telephone tappings showed relations between clubs' executives and referee organizations during the football seasons of 2004–05 and 2005–06, being accused of selecting favourable referees. This implicated league champions Juventus and several other clubs, including Fiorentina, Lazio, Milan, and Reggina. In July 2006, Juventus was stripped of the 2004–05 Serie A title, which was left unassigned, and was downgraded to last place in the 2005–06 Serie A, as the title was subsequently awarded to Inter Milan, and relegated to Serie B. In July 2006, the Italy national football team won the 2006 FIFA World Cup, beating the France national football team 5–3 in a penalty shoot-out following a 1–1 draw at the conclusion of extra time; eight Juventus players were on the football pitch in the 2006 FIFA World Cup final, five for Italy and three for France. Many prison sentences were handed out to sporting directors and referees but all were acquitted in 2015, after almost a decade of investigation, due to the expiration of the statute of limitations (at the time, it was about 4 years for the sports trial and 7.5 years for the ordinary trial), except for a one-year sentence confirmed to referee Massimo De Santis.

A subsequent investigation, dubbed Calciopoli bis, implicated many other clubs, including Brescia, Cagliari, ChievoVerona, Empoli, Inter Milan, Palermo, Udinese, and Vicenza; they were not put on trial due the statute of limitations. Although popularly known as a match-fixing scandal and focused on Juventus, no match-fixing violations were found within the intercepted calls for Juventus, there were no requests for specific referees, no demands for favours, no conversations between Juventus directors and referees were found, and the season was deemed fair and legitimate. The club was absolved from any wrongdoings in the first verdict, while its sporting executives Luciano Moggi and Antonio Giraudo were found guilty and banned for life six months before their previous five-year ban expired; they were absolved on charges related to sporting fraud, and appealed to the European Court of Human Rights, once they exhausted their appeals in Italy's courts. Other club executives were found guilty but did not receive lifetime bans and returned to their previous or new positions, among them Milan vice-president Adriano Galliani and Lazio president Claudio Lotito, both of whom retained or gained important positions in Lega Serie A. Most refeeres and their assistants were either found not guilty or had their sentences annulled due to the statute of limitations; only Massimo De Santis and Salvatore Racalbuto were convicted.

Italy's Court of Appeal rejected damage claims from Atalanta, Bologna, Brescia, and Lecce due to the fact that no match in the 2004–05 championship was altered by non-football episodes. This led Juventus to request €444 million in damage claims, later updated to €551 million, to both Inter Milan and the FIGC, restoration of the 2005 scudetto, and the officialization of the 2006 scudetto; all its appeals were either rejected due to the courts declaring themselves not competent or due to technical issues rather than juridical issues. Attempts for peace talks between Juventus, the FIGC, and other clubs did not improve relations, and the case remains much debated and controversial. Juventus returned to Serie A after winning the Serie B 2006–07 championship and in the UEFA Champions League the following two years but then struggled with two consecutive seventh places, before starting a record nine-consecutive league titles run, two Champions League finals, and four consecutive domestic doubles. Milan won the 2006–07 UEFA Champions League but only won the Serie A 2010–11 championship and struggled throughout the 2010s until winning the 2021–22 Serie A. Inter Milan started a cycle of five-consecutive league titles, culminating in the treble with the 2009–10 UEFA Champions League win but then struggled throughout the 2010s, with Napoli and Roma as Juventus' main rivals, until winning the 2020–21 Serie A during the COVID-19 pandemic in Italy. In April 2021, all three clubs found themselves united in the European Super League project. As of 2022, the last league winner outside the three of them is Roma in 2001.

Etymology and origins 
The name Calciopoli, which could be adapted in English as "Footballgate", by analogy with the Watergate scandal, and would be literally translated as "Footballville", was made up by the media by analogy with Tangentopoli (literally "Bribesville"), which is the name that was given to some corruption-based clientelism in Italy during the Mani pulite investigation in the early 1990s; in that case, the neologism was formed by combining the Italian word tangente ("bribe", from the Latin word tangens, which means "to touch" and in a wider sense "to be due to") and the Greek word polis ("city"), originally referring to Milan as "the city of bribes".

The scandal first came to light as a consequence of investigations of prosecutors on the Italian football agency GEA World. The leak of news that triggered Calciopoli in May 2006 did not start from the major sports or investigative press but rather came from Il Romanista, a newspaper entirely dedicated to Roma supporters, and whose founder Riccardo Luna continued to boast of being "the first to reveal the intrigues of Calciopoli". The first major sport newspaper to anticipate and report the scandal was Milan-based La Gazzetta dello Sport, which also anticipated the subsequent court rulings. Transcripts of recorded telephone conversations soon thereafter published in major Italian newspapers suggested that Juventus general director Luciano Moggi and Juventus CEO Antonio Giraudo had conversations with several Italian football officials to influence referee designations during the 2004–05 Serie A season.{{sfnm|1a1=La Repubblica, 12 May 2006a|2a1=The Observer, 30 July 2006a|3a1=The Observer, 30 July 2006b}} Notable referees, such as Pierluigi Collina and Roberto Rosetti, were among the few referees to emerge unscathed from the scandal.

 Investigation and sporting sentences 
On 8 May 2006, Franco Carraro resigned from the presidency of the FIGC, the body responsible for selecting Italy's FIFA World Cup national team; he remained a member of the UEFA's executive committee and as a FIFA official. Juventus' entire board of directors resigned on 11 May, while Moggi resigned shortly after Juventus won the 2005–06 Serie A championship on 14 May, saying: "They killed my soul." Giraudo stated: "We take our leave, but you will see that bandits will come after us." On the Borsa Italiana, Italy's stock market, Juventus shares had lost about half their 9 May value by the 19 May. Massimo De Santis was due to be Italy's refereeing representative at the 2006 World Cup; he was barred by the FIGC after coming under investigation. Roberto Rosetti remained untainted by the scandal, and was chosen as one of the twenty-one 2006 FIFA World Cup officials.

The scandal drew attention to many potential conflicts of interest within Italian football. Inter Milan provided sponsorship to the Serie A through Gruppo TIM, as Inter Milan vice-president Marco Tronchetti Provera was TIM director. Silvio Berlusconi, Milan's president and owner, was Prime Minister of Italy and owner of TV channel Mediaset through Fininvest, while Adriano Galliani, as the vice president and CEO of Milan, also served as the president of Serie A. Juventus has been historically owned by the Agnelli family since the 1930s, which controls, alongside the Elkann family, holding company Exor and automobile malnufacture FIAT but had no further involvement or conflict of interest in football other than the club. In addition to allegations of corruption and sporting fraud by owners, executives, players, referees, and league officials, Aldo Biscardi, the host of Italy's most popular football show, resigned amid allegations that he collaborated with Moggi to boost the club's image on television, compared to the Milanese side. Then-FIGC president Carraro was a former president of Milan and politically close to Berlusconi, while its successor Guido Rossi was a former member of Inter Milan's board of directors and minority Inter Milan shareholder. Journalist Christian Rocca commented: "I wonder why the Italian media say every possible abomination on the potential conflict of interest of Adriano Galliani, president of Lega [Calcio] and executive of Milan, but don't use the same criterion towards Guido Rossi, extraordinary commissioner of the [Italian Football] Federation and former executive of Moratti's Inter Milan from 1995 to 1999, and of Gigi Agnolin, appointed commissioner of referees but still former executive of Roma from 1995 to 2000 (instead of Moggi, look what a combination)." Federal prosecutor Carlo Porceddu, a critic of the trial, especially for its decision of revoking Juventus' title by assigning it to Inter Milan, stated in 2017 that Rossi appointed friends, one of whom was on Inter Milan's board of directors.

In all, magistrates in Naples formally investigated 41 people, and looked into 19 Serie A matches from the 2004–05 season and 14 Serie A matches from the 2005–06 season. Prosecutors in Turin examined the Juventus chairman Antonio Giraudo over transfers, suspected falsified accounts, and tax evasion. Prosecutors in Parma investigated Gianluigi Buffon, the national team goalkeeper, as well as Antonio Chimenti, Enzo Maresca, and Mark Iuliano, for suspected gambling on Serie A matches; all were cleared in the same year. After the first penalties were handed out, more clubs were looked at for possible links to the scandal. Lecce, Messina, and Siena were also investigated as prosecutors continued to analyze transcripts of telephone calls.

 Matches under investigation 
The standings of the 2005–06 Serie A championship, which was won by Juventus, were remade to retroactively punish implicated clubs the year prior. This controversially resulted in third-classified Inter Milan being awarded the scudetto by then-FIGC commissioner Guido Rossi after a vote, on whether the title should be assigned by the tre saggi ("Three Sages") Gerhard Aigner, Massimo Coccia, and Roberto Pardolesi, as well as Juventus' relegation, and four other clubs (Fiorentina, Lazio, Milan, and Reggina) received penalty points. Only Aigner voted in favour of the assignation, with Rossi's ultimate decisive push for the assignation, even though UEFA only needed the final standings, and the cited precedent of the unassigned 1926–27 Divisione Nazionale title, which was revoked from Torino and not assigned to Bologna as the second-classified club. The 2005–06 championship was never investigated, and only the 2004–05 Serie A championship, also won by Juventus, was revoked.

The nineteen matches of the 2004–05 championship under investigation by the Naples prosecutor were the following:
 Reggina–Juventus 2–1 (6 November 2004)Referee: Gianluca Paparesta
 Lecce–Juventus 0–1 (14 November 2004)Referee: Massimo De Santis
 Juventus–Lazio 2–1 (5 December 2004)Referee: Paolo Dondarini
 Fiorentina–Bologna 1–0 (5 December 2004)Referee: Massimo De Santis
 Bologna–Juventus 0–1 (12 December 2004)Referee: Tiziano Pieri
 Juventus–Udinese 2–1 (13 February 2005)Referee: Pasquale Rodomonti
 ChievoVerona–Lazio 0–1 (20 February 2005)Referee: Gianluca Rocchi
 Lazio–Parma 2–0 (27 February 2005)Referee: Domenico Messina
 Roma–Juventus 1–2 (5 March 2005)Referee: Salvatore Racalbuto
 Inter Milan–Fiorentina 3–2 (20 March 2005)Referee: Paolo Bertini
 Fiorentina–Juventus 3–3 (9 April 2005)Referee: Pierluigi Collina
 Milan–Brescia 1–1 (10 April 2005)Referee: Pasquale Rodomonti
 Bologna–Lazio 1–2 (17 April 2005)Referee: Paolo Tagliavento
 Siena–Milan 2–1 (17 April 2005)Referee: Pierluigi Collina
 Milan–ChievoVerona 1–0 (20 April 2005)Referee: Gianluca Paparesta
 ChievoVerona–Fiorentina 1–2 (8 May 2005)Referee: Paolo Dondarini
 Livorno–Siena 3–6 (8 May 2005)Referee: Massimo De Santis
 Lazio–Fiorentina 1–1 (22 May 2005)Referee: Roberto Rosetti
 Lecce–Parma 3–3 (29 May 2005)Referee: Massimo De Santis

Walter Distato and Leo Leonida from the University of London and Dario Maimone and Pietro Navarra from the University of Messina conducted a study on the 2004–05 Serie A championship. According to the study, Juventus averaged less points per game with investigated referees (De Santis, Rodomonti, Bertini, Dondarini, Rocchi, Messina, Gabriele, Racalbuto, and Tagliavento) than those who were not; Juventus averaged 2.63 points per game with the latter, and 1.89 points per game with the former. Fiorentina and Milan, two other clubs involved in the scandal, averaged 1.22 points per game with the latter, and 0.93 points per game with the former, and 2.19 points per game with the latter, and 2.0 points per game with the former, respectively. The only exception was Lazio, another club implicated in the scandal, which averaged 2.0 points per game with the former, and 0.81 points with the latter.

About their study, the authors wrote: "Ours is a purely statistical study. We are not interested, nor are we able to establish, if Moggi and the other executives under investigation could influence the matches, but from our point of view we can highlight three hypotheses more than valid: either there was no referee conditioning in the 2004–05 championship, or it existed but did not produce relevant results, or it's possible to think of a clash between executives for the acquisition of the football system that gave rise to winning and losing clubs in that which we can define as a 'parallel championship.'" Navarra, one of the authors, wrote: "In addition, in the study we also took into account the strength of the opponents faced by the teams involved. Juventus, for example, met stronger teams in matches directed by the referees under investigation. This could explain, at least in part, the considerable difference in the overall point average."

 Club punishments and Juventus' controversy 
On 4 July 2006, the FIGC prosecutor Stefano Palazzi called for all four clubs at the centre of the scandal to be thrown out of Serie A. Palazzi called for Juventus "being excluded from the Serie A Championship and assigned to a lower category to Serie B with 6 points deducted", while Fiorentina, Lazio, and Milan were to be also downgraded to last place in the 2005–06 Serie A and relegated to the 2006–07 Serie B. He also asked for point deductions to be imposed for the following season for the clubs (three for Milan and 15 for both Fiorentina and Lazio). The prosecutor also called for Juventus to be stripped of its 2005 title and downgraded to the last place in the 2006 league.

In the case against Reggina on 13 August, the prosecutor called for Reggina to be demoted to Serie B with a 15-point penalty. On 17 August, Reggina was handed down a 15-point penalty but no relegation from Serie A. Furthermore, the club was fined the equivalent of €100,000, while the club president Pasquale Foti was fined €30,000 and banned from all football-related activities for two-and-a-half years.

In the ruling, the Federal Commission of Appeal (CAF), a FIGC judicial court, stated that Juventus was not responsible for Fiorentina avoiding relegation, and that Moggi and Giraudo operated independently of Juventus and its owners. In addition, the court ruled that there was no evidence of match fixing, and there was no cupola or "Moggi system", as was reported by La Gazzetta dello Sport. Finally, referee selections were done in accordance with the rules of the FIGC, phone calls made by Moggi to referee designator Paolo Bergamo did not constitute in itself a sporting illicit, and there was no organization of yellow cards to give. Nonetheless, the sentence stated that "though Moggi didn't exercise his ability to condition matches, he still possessed the ability", and even though there were no Article 6 violations against Juventus, it introduced the much-disputed illecito associativo ("associative illicit") violation; the given motivation was that "Juventus' advantage was evidenced by their position in the standings at the end of the season."

On 28 July 2006, CAF judge Piero Sandulli said there were no illicits and the championship was regular. He commented: "The 2004/2005 championship wasn't falsified. The only doubt we could have was about that strange match between Lecce and Parma, a match that we have seen and reviewed. However, it can't be said that the championship has been falsified. There may have been an attempt to fix it, but it would have needed four or five combinations." In an interview with la Repubblica the day prior, Mario Serio, the then-director of the private law department at the Palermo Faculty of Law and one of the five members of the CAF who signed the verdict, stated: "It wasn't a unanimous decision, it wasn't shared." Despite a lack of evidence regarding match fixing and no Article 6 violation, only Juventus was sentenced to be relegated to Serie B and stripped of their titles after taking into consideration the collective interests of the parties involved in the investigation. Serio added: "We tried to interpret a collective sentiment. We listened to ordinary people and tried to put ourselves on the wavelength." According to Serio, while Juventus was relegated, the other clubs "were saved"; this happened "because people wanted it that way", referencing sentimento popolare ("people's feelings"). Serio said he wanted to convict then-FIGC president Franco Carraro and remove Milan from European competitions but Sandulli, Salvatore Catalano, and Mario Sanino put him into minority. Milan was saved because then-Milan vice-president Adriano Galliani stated that he was not aware of Milan referee clerk Leonardo Meani's behavior; this was proved to be false in later wiretaps and developments. Serio added: "We recognized everything about the CAF ruling, apart from two episodes: the falsified championship, the repeated offences of Juventus, [and] the existence of a system." Corrado De Biase, 1980 Totonero chief investigator, commented on the sentence of Francesco Saverio Borrelli, who spoke of a structured illicit as a crime committed by Moggi and his associates. He said: "We're talking about a structured illicit. But what is it? It doesn't exist. They want to make it clear that there's something different, anomalous. But structured illicit, not at all. There's no sporting illicit. We can't talk about things that don't exist in the sports judicial system. I still haven't seen any proof of sporting illicit. Until now, what I see is the violation of Article 1 of the Sports Justice Code, which requires members to behave according to the principles of loyalty, correctness, and probity. But of what we have read to date, it doesn't prove to me that there was an attempt to alter a match."

The CAF ruling was long disputed because of the severity of the punishment meted out to Juventus compared to the other clubs involved. The verdict remains controversial, as Juventus was charged with Article 1 violations, like the other involved clubs, and did not violate Article 6, but it was the sole club to be relegated. Juventus was charged of Article 6 violations through structured illicit, which was not part of the Code of Sports Justice, and was added to the new Code of Sports Justice after the scandal; accordingly, Juventus was charged with Article 6 violations through repeated Article 1 violations. As summarized by Carlo Garganese for Goal, "[the FIGC sentence] stated perfectly clearly  that no Article 6 violations (match-fixing/attempted match-fixing breaks the sixth article of the sporting code) were found within the intercepted calls and the season was fair and legitimate, but that the ex-Juventus directors nonetheless demonstrated they could potentially benefit from their exclusive relationship with referee designators Gianluigi Pairetto and Paolo Bergamo. There were, however, no requests for specific referees, no demands for favours and no conversations between Juventus directors and referees themselves." Calciopoli bis and the Naples trial showed that many other clubs were involved, which weakened the prosecutor's argument of Juventus' exclusivity, the main reason for the club's harsher punishment; according to Garganese, "their mere existence meant that the theory of Juventus' 'exclusivity' could no longer hold", and "for the first time credibility shifted in favour of those who had claimed that Moggi, Giraudo and Juventus had been the victims of a witch-hunt."

Another controversy was that related to Juventus' defence lawyer Cesare Zaccone, who stated that "a punitive relegation to the second division would be acceptable." In later years, Zaccone would clarify that he made the statement because Juventus was the only club risking more than one-division relegation (Serie C), as at that time only a few clubs were implicated and Juventus appeared to be the main culprit, and he meant for Juventus to have equal treatment with the other clubs, which were also risking to be relegated; only Juventus would be relegated, resulting in the club's appeal for damage claims in the subsequent years against the FIGC due to unequal treatment. Some critics and observers, including as judge De Biase, journalist and former Tuttosport director Giancarlo Padovan, Ju29ro, and journalists, such as Oliviero Beha and Angelo Furgione, alleged that Calciopoli and its aftermath were also a dispute within Juventus and between the club's owners, who wanted to get rid of Moggi and Giraudo, both of whom assumed an increased role in the club. Whatever their intentions, it is argued they condemned Juventus, firstly when Zaccone asked for relegation and point-deduction, and secondly when Montezemolo retired Juventus' appeal to the Lazio Regional Administrative Court (TAR), which amounted, as recounted by Corriere della Sera journalist Mario Sconcerti, to "a sort of public plea bargain" and guilty admission. In a 2020 interview with la Repubblica, Zaccone said he is a supporter of Torino, Juventus' derby rival, and revealed to have defended Juventus for money.

 Effect on Serie A and club appeals 
Initially, with Juventus, Fiorentina, and Lazio all relegated, Messina, Lecce, and Treviso would have remained in Serie A, despite finishing in the bottom three in the 2005–06 season. After the appeals, only Messina remained in Serie A. Clubs promoted from Serie B (Atalanta, Catania, and Torino) were unaffected and promoted to Serie A as normal. Based on the preliminary final league positions, Juventus and Milan would have earned a direct entry into the UEFA Champions League, Inter Milan and Fiorentina would have entered the third qualifying round of the Champions League, while Roma, Lazio, and ChievoVerona would have been eligible for the UEFA Cup. On 6 June 2006, the FIGC officially withdrew from the 2006 UEFA Intertoto Cup, costing Palermo a place in the third round of the competition, citing the fact that the 2005–06 Serie A standings could not be confirmed by the 5 June deadline. UEFA gave the FIGC a 25 July deadline to confirm the standings or face sanctions in the two larger European competitions, which was then extended to 26 July. After the appeals, Inter Milan, Roma, ChievoVerona, and Milan occupied Italy's four places for the 2006–07 UEFA Champions League. Inter Milan and Roma received a direct entry into the Champions League, while ChievoVerona and Milan started at the third qualifying round. Milan's entry was confirmed by UEFA shortly after the appeals process, and Milan went on to win the competition. Palermo, Livorno, and Parma took the 2006–07 UEFA Cup first-round slots originally given to Roma, Lazio, and ChievoVerona.

The clubs sent down to Serie B were initially expected to have a difficult road back to the top flight, as they would have had to finish in the top two of Serie B to be assured of promotion, and also had to avoid finishing in the bottom four to avoid being relegated to Serie C1. Juventus was initially docked 30 points, the equivalent of having ten wins nullified; the point penalty was later reduced to nine points, and went on to win Serie B in the 2006–07 season to make a swift return to Serie A. Fiorentina was docked fifteen points, was expected to struggle in Serie A, and faced an outside chance of relegation the following season but finished the 2006–07 Serie A season in sixth place, earning a place in the 2007–08 UEFA Cup. The relegation of Juventus also prompted a mass exodus of important players, such as Fabio Cannavaro, Emerson, Zlatan Ibrahimović, Lilian Thuram, Patrick Viera, and Gianluca Zambrotta; some thirty other Serie A players who participated at the 2006 FIFA World Cup opted to move to other European leagues in the wake of the scandal. Notably, Juventus captain Alessandro Del Piero and fellow stars Gianluigi Buffon, Mauro Camoranesi, Pavel Nedved, and David Trezeguet, including future defence's cornerstone Giorgio Chiellini and young stars like Claudio Marchisio, stayed through "the purgatory of Serie B". Notably, Del Piero defended his decision to remain at Juventus, referencing the club's nickname, "The Old Lady", and said that "a true gentleman never leaves his lady." Juventus rebuilt from the ground up, restructured their management team, built a new stadium, and renegotiated a number of key sponsorship contracts for the future. By the 2020s, the club had won a record-breaking nine-consecutive Serie A championships with three different coaches (former Juventus player Antonio Conte, Massimiliano Allegri, and Maurizio Sarri), along with four Coppa Italia and consecutive domestic doubles, four Supercoppa Italiana, and reached two UEFA Champions League finals, in 2015 and 2017, respectively. In a twist of fate, Calciopoli nemesis Inter Milan and former coach Conte ended Juventus' unprecedented Serie A run in 2021.

On 26 October, the second appeal reduced Lazio's penalty to three points, Juventus' reduced to nine points, and Fiorentina's reduced to fifteen points, while Milan was unsuccessful and still faced with an eight-point deduction. Juventus previously announced that they planned to appeal the punishment in the Italian civil courts, an action that would have brought further punishment to the clubs and the FIGC by FIFA, as FIFA has historically taken a dim view to government involvement in football administration. FIFA and UEFA announced that they had the option to suspend the FIGC, barring all Italian clubs from international play, if Juventus went to court; some analysts, such as ESPN, described them as "FIFA threats". After the FIGC threatened to freeze all Italian competition, which could have resulted Italy's national team not taking part at the UEFA Euro 2008 qualifying, Juventus dropped its appeal before the TAR on 31 August, the day before it was due to be heard; Italian National Olympic Committee (CONI) president Gianni Petrucci thanked John Elkann and Luca Cordero di Montezemolo, and FIFA president Sepp Blatter thanked Juventus, particularly Montezemolo, for dropping the appeal. Juventus officials cited the "willingness shown by sportive institutions [the FIGC and CONI] to review its case during [CONI's] arbitration." In retrospect, this decision in particular is criticized because it could have cleared Juventus' name and avoided relegation. In addition, some critics alleged that the decision could also be partially explained by Montezemolo's relations with then-Inter Milan vice-president Marco Tronchetti Provera, who was also owner of Inter Milan's sponsor Telecom Italia, which would go on in 2007 to sponsor Scuderia Ferrari, of which Montezemolo was president; Montezemolo was also Confindustria president, while Tronchetti Provera was Confindustria vice-president. Both Montezemolo and Tronchetti Provera were implicated in the SISMI-Telecom scandal, but they were not processually involved. In a la Repubblica interview, Telecom's old security guided by Giuliano Tavaroli dismissed the theory that the Telecom management was unaware of those spying operations, saying that they were worried about protecting Montezemolo, its favourite candidate for the Confindustria presidency.

 Inter Milan's controversial 2006 scudetto assignation 
On 26 July, the FIGC declared Inter Milan as the Italian football champion for the 2005–06 season. Regarding this decision, Carlo Porceddu, federal prosecutor from 1998 to 2001 and vice-president of the Federal Court of Appeal, stated in an interview with Unione Sarda: "Revoking the 2005/2006 scudetto from Juventus and assigning to Inter Milan was a serious mistake. The Calciopoli investigation should have been more thorough, so much so that we, as the Federal Court, had limited the penalty to Juventus not withdrawing the championship title due to insufficient evidence. In fact, that aspect had been neglected. Then, the special commissioner of the [Italian Football] Federation of that period had appointed a group of his friends, one of whom was also on the board of directors of Inter Milan, and that title was revoked from Juventus and given to Inter Milan. That was a grave error in my view." Purceddu also highlighted how several aspects of the investigation needed to be  clarified.

Franco Carraro, Rossi's predecessor, was another critic of Rossi's decision, especially because, as Carraro recalled years later, "a month later Rossi goes to be president of Telecom for the second time, whose largest shareholder is Marco Tronchetti Provera, vice-president of Inter Milan." Piero Sandulli, president of the FIGC National Court of Appeal, was against giving the scudetto to Inter Milan, and stated to have been criticized at that time for it; in later years, Sandulli reiterated that the title should not have been assigned to Inter Milan. The decision was further condemned because of Inter Milan's involvement, among other clubs not originally implicated, which could not be put on trial due to the statute of limitations. This caused a dispute between the FIGC, Inter Milan, and Juventus. Although it was deemed likely, or almost certain, that the FIGC would revoke Inter Milan's scudetto, and despite Juventus' appeals to have it revoked even without giving it back to Juventus, it did not happen; the FIGC's Federal Council voted to declare itself not competent.

 Later developments and trials 
 SIM cards and wiretaps 
By April 2007, some new details about the Calciopoli affair were disclosed, as Naples prosecutors were able to find out a series of telephone calls through foreign SIM cards between Moggi, Bergamo, Pairetto, and several referees. Since the conversations were through foreign SIM cards, the Italian police could not tap them, so they could only try to match together phone numbers, numbers called, and places; nonetheless, it were those SIM cards that ultimately proved, not without controversy, to be the reason for Moggi's conviction, whose charges had been reduced to be close enough to "the limit of the existence of the crime of attempt". The SIM cards had been purchased in a store in Chiasso (Switzerland); some SIM cards were Swiss and registered to the store owner's family, while the others came from an anonymous person in Liechtenstein. The prosecutors also discovered the use of a Slovenian SIM card. In this investigation they involved Moggi, Pairetto, Bergamo, Fabiani (Messina sporting director), the referees De Santis, Racalbuto, Paparesta, Pieri, Cassarà, Dattilo, Bertini, and Gabriele, and the referee assistant Ambrosino. According to this investigation, Paparesta also used the Swiss SIM card for personal use and this helped the prosecutors to discover this secret communication channel. Apparently, Moggi had five foreign SIM cards, two of which had been used to communicate with Bergamo and Pairetto, whereas the others had supposed to have been used to communicate with the referees and Fabiani. Moreover, another wiretap was unveiled by the Italian daily La Stampa. Although containing nothing truly compromising, it recorded Moggi and Marcello Lippi (former coach of Juventus and coach of Italy national football team at that time) insulting Inter Milan president Massimo Moratti and Inter Milan coach Roberto Mancini. Lippi stated that Mancini deserved a lesson, while Moggi answered that Mancini would have such a lesson.

On 26 April 2007, about two hundred audio files of the wiretaps, some published one year before in the written form and some never published, were released; this allowed readers to perceive tones and forms of the conversations. Milan, originally ejected from the 2006–07 Champions League due to the scandal, went on to win the competition on 23 May. On 17 June, on the Italian show Qui studio a voi stadio, a popular football show broadcast by the local TV Telelombardia based in Milan, Bergamo said that Moggi gave two Swiss SIM cards to Pairetto, who then gave one of those SIM cards to him. Bergamo stated that, on suspicion of being tapped, he used that SIM card only to communicate with Pairetto and that, after the exhaustion of the credit, he did not use the SIM card anymore. In June 2008, Juventus was fined a further €300,000 in three installments, while Messina were fined €60,000. On 14 December 2009, Giraudo was sentenced to three years in prison.

In October 2008, chief prosecutor Giuseppe Narducci was quoted in court as saying: "Like it or not, no other calls exist between the designators and other directors." During the Calciopoli trial in Naples, the legal team of Moggi released a number of wiretaps showing that Inter Milan, as well as Milan, had been involved in the Serie A scandal during 2004 and 2005. Such wiretaps involved Milan vice-president Adriano Galliani, Milan employee Leonardo Meani, Inter Milan owner Massimo Moratti, then-Inter Milan president Giacinto Facchetti, and former referee designators Paolo Bergamo and Pierluigi Pairetto, as well as many other Italian clubs not previously mentioned in the scandal.

During the October 2010 industrial espionage case against Telecom Italia (SISMI-Telecom scandal), Tronchetti Provera (Pirelli president and former CEO, Inter Milan shareholder and former vice-president, and former Telecom president), confirmed the statements delivered by Caterina Plateo (former Telecom employee) in her testimony that the company was spying on members of the football realm on behalf of Inter Milan; these revelations were brought to the Naples trial. When Calciopolis chief investigator Colonnel Attilio Auricchio was cross-examined by Moggi's lawyer, it was revealed that he had tampered evidence prior to handing it over to the sporting tribunal in 2006. According to Carlo Garganese, Auricchio did this "by pulling out the thousands upon thousands of calls made by directors and coaches to referee designators that would have shown no one had an exclusive relationship." Inter Milan's implicating calls, among other clubs', which were not ordered to be transcribed, were signed with three moustache-like red lines to indicate the grade of gravity.

In September 2011, Salvatore Racalbuto's lawyer Giacomo Mungiello stated: "No probative value can be attributed to the Swiss SIM cards themselves. According to the prosecutor, the cell phone would have hooked up the cell near Racalbuto's house in Gallarate on the evening of the match. Today we produce a document which shows that on both occasions the referee slept in the hotel the same evening and didn't return home. Among the texts heard, there was Coppola, who told us that he had presented himself to the Carabinieri, invited by Borrelli's appeal, and that he had told them to tell them something about Inter Milan, but the Carabinieri didn't want to know and they were interested only in Juventus, which tells us all about the way the investigation went."

 Palazzi's 2011 report and Naples developments 
On 15 June 2011, six months prior to their initial five-year ban's expiration, the FIGC announced that Moggi, Giraudo, and Mazzini would be banned for life from any football-related roles in Italy. Despite popular perception of a match-fixing scandal and Calciopoli being referred to as match-fixing in association football, especially in the beginnings and its first phase, the sentence stated that no Article 6 (about match fixing or attempted match-fixing) violations were found within the intercepted calls, and the season was fair and legitimate. Furthermore, no requests for specific referees, no demands for favours, and no conversations between Juventus directors and referees themselves were found; their lifetime ban was because they could potentially benefit from their exclusive relations with referee designators.

In July 2011, the FIGC chief investigator Stefano Palazzi alleged in his report that, in addition to Moggi, other club officials violated the Code of Sporting Justice by contacting referee designators in illegal manners, which contradicted Moggi and Giraudo's exclusivity; they included Article 1 violations by Nello Governato (Brescia), Massimo Cellino (Cagliari), Luca Campedelli (ChievoVerona), Fabrizio Corsi (Empoli), Massimo Moratti (Inter Milan), Leonardo Meani (Milan), Rino Foschi (Palermo), Pasquale Foti (Reggina), Luciano Spalletti (Udinese), and Sergio Gasparin (Vicenza), and Article 6 violations by Giacinto Facchetti (Inter Milan), Leonardo Meani (Milan), and Aldo Spinelli (Livorno). According to Palazzi's findings, these clubs had to be punished during the Calciopoli trial, but no court could confirm these allegations since all facts are covered by the statute of limitation. In regard to Inter Milan's 2006 scudetto, Palazzi wrote: "Inter Milan appears to be the only club against which, in hypothesis, concrete consequences can arise on the sporting level, even if indirectly with respect to the outcome of the disciplinary procedure." In response to Palazzi's report, Giancarlo Abete, then-president of the FIGC, stated that there were no legal ground to revoke the title from Inter Milan; he hinted that Inter Milan should give away the title and leave it unassigned on the basis of ethics.

During the Naples trial, Moggi's lawyer Maurilio Prioreschi asked the court to take in consideration that between 2006 (the year of the first sentences) and 2011 (the year of the sentence on Moggi's lifetime ban) numerous hearings were held during the criminal trial in Naples, from which wiretaps involving other club executives that, according to Moggi's legal defence, would drop the basic assumption of the 2006 sports conviction, namely that relating to the conditioning of the referees thanks to the preferential treatment by the referee designators towards Moggi and Juventus, which in turn led to the sporting offence. Many of those wiretaps formed the body of Palazzi's report, with which the FIGC chief prosecutor intended to refer many executives and clubs for violations of the Code of Sports Justice, a circumstance that was prevented only by the statute of limitation. The court's Disciplinary Commission purposely ignored this defensive argument, and arguing that it was a reassessment of the facts not permitted at that time, no importance was given to the conduct of those other executives and clubs which had just emerged during the criminal trial. According to the FIGC's Federal Court of Justice, as explained in its judgment of appeal in regards to the term attualizzare ("actualize"), the court was there not to expand the evidence on which the first judgment was based but rather to ascertain whether at that time those established facts were still serious enough to justify a lifetime ban; it concluded that this ruling must be expressed exclusively "on the basis of the sentences rendered" against Moggi, and cannot take into consideration any comparative judgment with conducts possibly attributable to other subjects of the FIGC law. The court stated that to have a reassessment of the facts of Calciopoli, it would be necessary to request and open a revocation of judgment pursuant to Article 39 of the Code of Sports Justice.

On 8 November 2011, the Naples court issued the first conclusion of the criminal case against Moggi and the other football personalities involved, sentencing him to jail for five years and four months for criminal association. In December 2013, Moggi's sentence was reduced to two years and four months for being found guilty of conspiring to commit a crime; the earlier charge of sporting fraud passed the statute of limitations. On 17 March 2014, the Naples court confirmed Moggi, Pairetto, and Mazzini's conviction for the same charge. In its ruling's motivation, the court wrote of "a proven system already operating in the years 1999/2000 between the subjects, who along the lines of weaving 'friendly relations' were carrying out conduct aimed at phasing the real scope and potential of some football teams", to which Paolo Ziliani, a journalist who is known for his anti-Juventus claims, commented for Il Fatto Quotidiano that, even though three of them were won by clubs other than Juventus, they should be also revoked; no evidence was provided for the claim, and none of the previous leagues were investigated. Of the indicated allegedly altered championships, Juventus won four of them (2001–02, 2002–03, 2004–05, and 2005–06), one of which (2001–02) was won in the last match and became known as "the scudetto of 5 May", and two of which (2004–05 and 2005–06) were the only ones to be revoked from Juventus, while Lazio (1999–2000), Roma (2000–01), and Milan (2003–04) each won one scudetto, respectively. The first alleged altered championship was one year after the Inter Milan–Juventus' second leg match, and the first year with Pairetto and Bergamo as referee designators. Moggi's charge, as written in the Naples sentence, was not that he fixed matches or leagues but that his behavior was close enough to "the limit of the existence of the crime of attempt", hence the conviction; none of the allegations were proven but the holding of Swiss sim cards was deemed to be enough to justify the crime of attempt and conviction.

 Supreme Court sentence and Juventus' appeals 
On 23 March 2015, the Supreme Court of Cassation, Italy's highest court of appeal, ruled in its final resolution, which came after six hours of deliberation, that Moggi was acquitted of "some individual charges for sporting fraud, but not from being the 'promoter' of the 'criminal conspiracy' that culminated in Calciopoli." The remaining charges of Moggi were cancelled without a new trial due to the statute of limitations; Giraudo's sentence also expired in March 2015. Appeals by Fiorentina owners Andrea and Diego Della Valle and Lazio president Claudio Lotito against their sentences were rejected on the same ground, as their cases passed the statute of limitations. The court accepted the prosecutor's request to clear charges of former referees Paolo Bertini, Antonio Dattilo, and Gennaro Mazzei but rejected the appeals for Massimo De Santis and Savaltore Racabulto. Shortly after the court's decision, the then-FIGC president Carlo Tavecchio remarked in an interview with ANSA that "while the motivations may be pending, the sentence confirms the thesis of the prosecution", and "the crimes were real and so was the criminal conspiracy." In response to the final verdict, Moggi said: "We mucked about for nine years and that's not nice because this abnormal trial has come to nothing. Just a lot of expense. In nine years, it has been established that the championship was by the book, the draws were by the book and there were no conversations about designations." He added that it let the courts off the hook, not him, and vowed to turn to the European courts to have his ban from football world lifted.

On 9 September 2015, the Supreme Court released a 150-page document that explained its final ruling of the case. As reported by Milan-based La Gazzetta dello Sport, although Moggi's remaining charges being cancelled without a new trial due to statute of limitations, the court made clear that Moggi's unwarranted activities incurred significant damage to Italian football not only in sporting, but also in economic terms. In the document, the court confirmed that Moggi was actively involved in the sporting fraud which was intended to favour Juventus and increase his own personal benefits; according to Gazzetta World, the document also stated that Moggi had "unjustified and excessive power within Italian football", which he used to exert influence over referees, other club officials, and the media, thereby creating "an illegal system to condition matches of the 2004/05 championship (and not just those)." Turin-based Tuttosport reported: "Justice decided that Moggi and Giraudo actually 'polluted' the system, it decided so in 2006 and didn't want to know or understand other truths. Indeed, it had already decided it during the investigations, when all the phone calls that could exonerate or alleviate the position of Juventus' executives had not been taken into consideration, to the point of dismantling the very concept of the Cupola. Moggi and Giraudo, therefore, 'polluted' the system: a term that serves to dodge the fact that no judge has ever returned enough evidence to affirm that championship (the subject of investigation was only 2004–05) has actually been altered. Indeed, in the first instance sentence we basically read the opposite." The Supreme Court commented that "the system of the arrangement of the [referee] grids was rather widespread", and the developments in the behavior of Inter Milan's Giacinto Facchetti and Milan's Leonardo Meani were not "deepened by the investigations". On 15 March 2017, Moggi's lifetime ban was definitively confirmed on final appeal.

Having been cleared of wrongdoings and not being liable by other clubs because the 2004–05 season was deemed regular, Juventus appealed to have the two league titles back and damage claims due to disparity of treatment in the sporting trial. In September 2016, the District Court rejected the claim from Juventus because it had no jurisdiction over CONI arbitration chamber's decision made in October 2006. In December 2018, the Supreme Court upheld this District Court's decision on tehnical grounds. In January 2019, Juventus handed another appeal to sports tribunal under CONI to have the 2005–06 Serie A title removed from Inter Milan. The appeal was rejected on 6 May 2019. Further appeals were rejected in 2022 as not admissible.

 Verdicts 
Initial verdicts (bans July 2006, sentences November 2011) handed out to the following individuals:
 Luciano Moggi: five-year ban from football and five years and four months' imprisonment; acquitted in 2015
 Antonio Giraudo: five-year ban from football and three years' imprisonment; acquitted in 2015
 Tullio Lanese: thirty-month ban from football
 Innocenzo Mazzini: five-year ban from football and 26 months' imprisonment
 Massimo De Santis: four-year ban from football and 23 months' imprisonment
 Diego Della Valle: forty-five-month ban from football and fifteen months' imprisonment
 Andrea Della Valle: three-year ban from football and fifteen months' imprisonment
 Pierluigi Pairetto: forty-two-month ban from football and sixteen months' imprisonment
 Pasquale Foti: thirty-month ban from football and fined €30,000
 Claudio Lotito: thirty-month ban from football and seventeen months' imprisonment
 Leonardo Meani: thirty-month ban from football and one year's imprisonment
 Sandro Mencucci: thirty-month ban from football and fifteen months' imprisonment
 Fabrizio Babini: three-month ban from football
 Gennaro Mazzei: six-month ban from football
 Adriano Galliani: nine-month ban from football
 Gianluca Paparesta: three-month ban from football
 Claudio Puglisi: three-month ban from football and one year's imprisonment and fined €20,000
 Franco Carraro: fined €80,000
 Salvatore Racalbuto: one year and eight months' imprisonment
 Paolo Bertini: seventeen months' imprisonment
 Antonio Dattilo: seventeen months' imprisonment
 Stefano Titomanlio: one year's imprisonment and fined €20,000

 Impact and reception 
The scandal hit hard on Italian football, with its top league (Serie A) being considered the top European league, one of the best, and the golden age of football throughout the 1980s and the 1990s. The case remains controversial and divisive, especially between the FIGC, Inter Milan, and Juventus, mainly due to Juventus' harsh punishment, as well as the FIGC's decision to have the 2005–06 scudetto assigned to Inter Milan, both of which are criticized, and resulted in Italian football decline and supporters' exodus. It also did not stop the development of further scandals, such as the 2011–12 Italian football match-fixing scandal (Scomessopoli). In September 2011, the polling company Demos & Pi published in la Repubblica found that of those in the population who defined themselves as tifosi dropped from 52% to 45%; in addition, the poll showed that 55% of tifosi were suspicious whenever a referee makes a mistake. The poll found that 56.5% of the sample examined was sceptical of the regularity of the decisions taken by sports justice, while 24.9% judged the Calciopoli scandal "as a case of sports justice that led to the right decisions." 43.5% of the same sample said that the 2005–06 title "[should] not be awarded to anyone", compared to 33.7% who believed that the title should remain at Inter Milan, or be given to other clubs. In addition, the poll revealed that Juventus remained the most supported club at 30%, followed by Inter Milan at 19%, and Milan at 16%, while Inter Milan became the most hated, surpassing Juventus; polarization increased, with 10% more supporters expressing hatred towards at least one club, for a total of 50%, and with militant, ultras groups holding a bigger share of tifo. When Juventus returned to win in an unprecedented nine-year consecutive championship run, even as the club was absolved and no match involving Juventus was altered, discussions and accusations without evidence, as no other championship other than that of 2004–05 has been investigated, "a new Calciopoli" emerged. Commonly cited events include two Juventus matches; one was against Milan in 2012, the other against Inter Milan in 2018.

Supporters of the trials, such as prosecutor Giuseppe Narducci, journalist Marco Travaglio, and coach Zdeněk Zeman, cite Moggi's guilty verdict, and the court's view that he was the promoter of the criminal conspiracy that culminated in Calciopoli as evidence that the scandal was real. Critics respond that the first investigation was conducted too hastily, question why wiretaps implicated many other clubs were not revealed earlier, and state that it was not legal, as wiretaps were obtained through illegal means, or that too much weight was given to them, and many of Moggi's wiretaps were decontextualized. In addition, they argue that convictions, such as Moggi's, did not give weight to later developments, such as several points of the prosecution being contradicted, other clubs' involvement which was not not considered due to the fact they came to light after the statute of limitation, that the season was deemed fair and legitimate, as no match result was altered, and Juventus did not violate Article 6 (sporting illicit, which warrants relegation), and was only charged through a newly made-up rule in the Code of Sports Justice after the events, while other clubs (Inter Milan, Livorno, and Milan) were found to have directly violated Article 6 according to the FIGC chief investigator Stefano Palazzi, whose earlier charges in the first phase were mostly confirmed. Moggi's legal defence asked the Naples court to take this in consideration but the court denied it, arguing that it was a reassessment of the facts not permitted at that time.

Juventus' harsh punishment was subjected to criticism, even more so due to later developments and investigations, and several critics argue that only Juventus was truly punished, while other clubs or executives were not punished as harshly, or got away from it, and Italian football is in no better shape than it was then. Juventus' owners and legal defence, especially in the first phase when they renounced their appeal to the TAR and did not defend the club effectively, is also criticized; some critics alleged that several Juventus' then-owners and board of directors took their personal interests and relations above that of the club, or that they wanted to get rid of Moggi and Giraudo, both of whom were becoming major Juventus shareholders. Il processo illecito and Juventus il processo farsa: inchiesta verità su Calciopoli took a critical look at the case, citing several inaccuracies, inconsistencies, and still unclear aspects; several observers, including some supporters of the trials, said there were inconsistencies and there remains some unclear aspects, for instance how the 2015 final ruling, as commented by Giovanni Capuano for Panorama, "further reduce[d] the perimeter of Moggi's cupola, the system that led to the sports verdict of the summer of 2006: could the [sports] directors (Moggi and Giraudo), [the referee designators] Pairetto, Mazzini, and only [the referees] De Santis with Racalbuto be enough?" Moggi's legal defence commented: "This trial starts with about fifty suspects including referees and [referee] assistants plus the leaders of the [Italian Football] Federation, today this mega criminal association is reduced to two referees and three matches. Once all the skimmings have been made, [with] the referees and [their] assistants acquitted, Moggi would have done all sports fraud alone. He would sit down and say, 'I will change the match score in the morning.'" Some of Italian media's reaction and behavior, including sensationalism, was also subjected to criticism.

 Reactions 
During the sports trial in July 2006, some political forces, such as Forza Italia and Popolari UDEUR, tried to promote the idea of ​​an amnesty, as it was done after the 1980 Totonero scandal for the 1982 FIFA World Cup, in the event of the victory of Italy national football team at the 2006 FIFA World Cup, which ended up occurring. Giovanna Melandri, then-Minister of Youth Policies and Sport from the Democrats of the Left, firmly rejected the amnesty hypothesis, calling it "an idiocy".

Francesco Cossiga, former President of Italy and Prime Minister of Italy, criticized the scandal's effect on individuals, such as then-Juventus player Gianluca Pessotto attempting suicide, and compared it to the Mani pulite scandal's aftermath. Cossiga also expressed strong words and criticism for the FIGC's Federal Court of Appeal. Silvio Berlusconi, former Prime Minister of Italy and then-Milan owner and president, rejected an amnesty but added: "Any sanctions must not hit the players, many of whom, among other things, have just shown on the pitch that they are the best in the world, and don't deserve to go to [Serie] B or [Serie] C. And then the fans, who have no responsibility." About the trial, Berlusconi stated: "This is a trial without the indispensable characteristics of certainty, which any trial should have, for at least three reasons. First: not all the telephone calls from the judges were heard. Second: not all the witnesses were heard. Third: the reality of the pitch has highlighted situations different from those that should have occurred. They all seem to me sufficient reasons to affirm that there is no guarantee of reaching conclusions based on the facts, by the judges." About relegations, of which all involved clubs at that time were sanctioned for, Berlusconi said: "I'm against every club's relegations and I don't speak as the president of Milan. I'm against it because relegating a club like Juventus would also damage the interests of third parties. In fact, how many clubs without any fault of their own would be forced to give up the proceeds of a match against Juventus? And then we must also think about the damage that is created to sponsors and television companies that had already signed onerous contracts." With only Juventus relegated, the 2006–07 Serie B championship had better TV ratings than the 2006–07 Serie A championship. Juventus' matches were the most watched, the stadiums had better revenues, and were sold-out whenever Juventus played; Serie A returned to be competitive only when Juventus came back to Serie A for the 2007–08 Serie A championship.

In December 2007, before its own club was found in the 2011 Palazzi report to have violated both Article 1 and Article 6, Berlusconi stated: "Calciopoli was all a hoax, did you understand it or not? Some clubs had influence and claimed it, and we have lost a few scudetti." In response, Gavino Angius, then-senator from the Democratic Left and a Roma supporter, commented: "A hoax? I doubt that Siena and Empoli had the strength to plot against Milan. Berlusconi should speak out and call into question the Nerazzurri cousins [Inter Milan] because they are those who he should be referring to." Maurizio Paniz, then-deputy from Forza Italia and president of the Juventus Club of Montecitorio, rejoiced: "I agree. Calciopoli was a frame with which Italy got hurt in front of the world. And Juve as a club, players, fans, and shareholders had unduly paid."

 Sporting trial 
Writing for Il Foglio, Christian Rocca stated: "For a week, Italians have had media proof that Juventus is buying referees. But this 'proof' comes from a request for dismissal which, on the contrary and without any doubt, proves how Juventus didn't buy the referees." Italian magistrate Marcello Maddalena justified the dismissal because it is "an investigation undoubtedly destined to last for years and to fill the pages of newspapers and radio and television broadcasts forever, but for the start of which, it is repeated, it hasn't remained at the state (after all the investigations that have been carried out), not even a shred of 'news' that allows it." About Juventus' punishment, Rocca wrote: "In a normal country there would have been a public apology to Juventus and only, I repeat only, a severe ethical and disciplinary judgment against the designator of the referees and the director of a sports club caught having too close relations. Rome and Naples [trials] concern something else, as far as we know: the management of players, not referees."

Writing for Il Tirreno, Enzo Biagi stated: "[This was a] crazy ruling, and not because football is a clean environment. A crazy ruling because it's built on nothing, on wiretaps that are difficult to interpret and can't be proposed in a [trial] procedure worthy of the name, a crazy sentence because it punishes those who were guilty only of living in a certain environment, all seasoned with a process that was a re-edition of the Holy Inquisition in a modern key." Biagi wondered whether Moggi has been identified as "the villain to be fed to the populace" amid numerous other scandals in the country at that time, including the SISMI-Telecom scandal. Biagi's words would be later revoked due to the Calciopoli bis developments. Among others, former Milan and Italy national football team coach Arrigo Sacchi opined that Moggi was a scapegoat for "an environment with connivance and collusion", and of a sporting culture that "did not allow us to know how to lose." About the court's rulings, Sacchi stated: "We had three judicial bodies and all three expressed themselves in a different way from the other: either the first sentence was wrong, or the second or the third."

Corrado De Biase, the head of the investigation office at the time of the 1980 Totonero betting scandal, stated: "First of all, we must have the courage to affirm a reality: this summer's procedure gave birth to an authentic legal abort. When I speak of 'legal abort' I take full responsibility for what I say. When you want to complete a procedure in two weeks that would take at least 6 months just for a correct investigative process, it can only result in a legal abort. When, for reasons of time, a degree of judgment is received, when the defendants are prevented from bringing witnesses, dossiers and films in their defence, but only 15 minutes are allowed for a defence, one can only speak of legal abort. When the defence lawyers of the accused are not granted the full texts of the wiretaps, alleging that they are not pertinent, we can only speak of legal abort. Finally, when a title is disassigned to a club, Juventus, to assign it to another, Inter Milan, before the verdict of the first preliminary iter is pronounced, then we are well beyond legal abort. It's not a problem of ordinary or sporting justice: in any country that defines itself as civil, any penalties and sanctions must be imposed after a guilty verdict has been recorded, never before. And don't talk to me about UEFA regulations or lists to be given to the same for the European cups: the rights of the accused, including that of being able to defend themselves with the means that the law makes available to them, come before a football match." About punishments, De Biase stated: "I, on my own, can only reiterate the concept already expressed: a penalty of 8/10 points, a fine, and a ban of Moggi and Giraudo for 10/12 months, this was the appropriate penalty in my opinion. Any parallel with the story of 1980 is unthinkable: here there're no traces of offence, nor of money or checks. The environmental offence isn't a crime covered by any code, unless we're talking about air pollution."

Citing numerous quotes, Emanuele Boffi for Tempi wondered whether the real scandal was the way it was told, and how through "[p]ages and pages of poison reports" the defendants "Moggi & co were already convicted before the sentences." Boffi wrote that "the Turin Public Prosecutor's Office, which had first viewed all the wiretaps, had dismissed the case as 'the accusatory hypotheses are without confirmation' and for 'the absence of any useful information on any corruption.' Marcello Maddalena, prosecutor of the Turin Republic, also reiterates this in a letter to the newspaper La Repubblica, which the day before had accused him of 'investigative shyness.' Maddalena writes that no evidence emerged from the interceptions that would confirm the original investigative hypothesis (corruption of a public official) for which they had been authorized.' And on the other hand, as Borrelli declares, on the day of the interrogations of the referees, 'there're no pentiti (June 8). But the culprits were already there."

As recounted by Boffi, magistrates Antonio Di Pietro and Nello Rossi had "some professional qualms about reading verbal or wiretapping all the holy days, maybe even the right and left justicialists should ask some questions." Il Corriere della Sera reported: "We're facing a demonization. Ours is a country of civil guarantees. For now we only know the press reports, however, emphasized with this system of advertising wiretapping, a barbaric system. The laws on the violation of the secret of investigation never find condemnation for those who have violated them. We thought that wiretapping was a prerogative of the fascist regime and instead, obviously, this isn't the case." Article 114 of the Code of Criminal Procedure stated that "the publication, even partial or summarized, by means of the press or other means of dissemination, of the documents covered by secrecy or even their content alone is prohibited." Former Italy national football team coach Giovanni Trapattoni stated: "Anyone who is indignant is a hypocrite, speaking of a dome is an exaggeration." In writing about the press' comparisons to Mafia and criminal association, Boffi stated that it was "[a] system ... meticulously tried in the press and somewhat hastily in the courtroom", quoting the defendant Massimo De Santis as saying: "In seven thousand pages there's no trace of a phone call from me with Moggi. I was judged in the newspapers and on TV. I got to know the developments of the investigations by going to newsstands."La Repubblica, which took a colpevolisti stance, expressed some doubts. The paper reported: "No witnesses were admitted to the trial. Even the worst of criminals has the right to a testimony in favour. The sprint start of the public prosecutor Palazzi was a rash step. The approach of the trial is singular. Strange that no one asks questions ... , we go into little on the merits. The speed is understandable, but in the 1980s [Italian football betting scandal] and in many other cases the judging committees went late at night." De Biase stated: "I have only read detached sentences in the newspapers, I don't think I have read about a sporting offence to alter the result. I don't seem to have seen matches bought or sold. When I hear from Commissioner Rossi that he will do everything himself and that can come to judgment even without questioning, there is something that does not add up." Lawyer Gaetano Scalise commented: "The special commissioner of the FIGC has given us only three days to study thousands and thousands of papers and present briefs. Do you understand what I'm talking about?" About one wiretap in which Giraudo stated of a referee that "if he's smart, he halves Udinese", De Santis commented: "'I enjoyed downloading the call times from the internet. And if you check them too, you will understand everything.' Was the phone call after the offending match? 'That's right.'" About Francesco Saverio Borrelli, journalist Giorgio Bocca stated: "The appointment of Borrelli to direct the investigation into the great football scandal is the litmus test, the chemical reagent, the proof of truth, the fall of lies, the naked king of the Berlusconi people who 'don't give up', who don't tolerate returns to justice, who conceive democracy only as an alliance of the strongest and richest clans."

 Naples trial and Supreme Court 
Upon hearing one new wiretap and other wiretaps implicating Inter Milan, journalist Elio Corno stated: "Only for this phone call [referring to a 26 November 2004 wiretap between Carraro, former president of the FIGC, and Bergamo, former referee designator, who was asked to not favour Juventus against Inter Milan], the Calciopoli trial had to be annulled, it had to be immediately annulled." In another TV broadcast, Corno stated: "May we say, with great honesty, that this Calciopoli sporting trial was a farce?" Journalist Giuseppe Cruciani stated: "I'm not a Juventus fan. I sympathize with the Bianconeri from 2006 onwards because I believe that what happened to Juventus with Calciopoli was a great injustice and I'm on the side of those who are against injustices." Journalist Oliviero Beha saw Moggi as a scapegoat; in 2011, he wrote that "Moggi, branded as the Al Capone of football, served perfectly as a stopper for a bottle of bad liqueur for public drunkenness, ending up in a trap." In November 2021, Italy's Supreme Court confirmed the sentence against RAI to compensate the relatives of Beha, who had died in 2017, with €180,000 for having subjected him to demotion between 2008 and 2010 due to his critical positions on the Calciopoli trials.

During the Naples trial in 2010, lawyer Flavia Tortorella of the Italian Footballers' Association, said: "Rather than asking myself why it happened, I would ask myself questions about what will happen in the future, when the investigation of the fact in criminal proceedings arrives. Calciopoli, at least legally speaking, was this: the sporting trial had to be managed in a different way, in the sense that the proceedings had to necessarily wait for the investigation of the fact in a criminal case, first of all because the sporting legislation at that historical moment was not ripe for contain a case of this kind. The legislation, the Sports Justice Code, which is the current one with some changes that have occurred from 2006 to today, was by no means a code that could contain a sporting proceeding of that magnitude and provide for sanctions regulations for that type of offence, and in fact they invented, so to speak, the structured offence because for the types of offence codified and typified within the code of sporting justice absolutely could neither be initiated nor terminated in that way a procedure of that type." In an interview with Tuttosport, lawyer Paolo Rodella stated: "Compared to the summer of 2006, new facts are emerging. Wanting to be flexible, we can even think of a revision on the basis of the interceptions presented in Naples. They clearly constitute elements that, if they were already known by the sports justice bodies, they would have influenced the sentence, which would have been of a different nature, at least on the plurality of the subjects sanctioned."

After the Naples trial, Carlo Rossini reported that "Juventus has been acquitted, the offending championships (2004/2005 and 2005/2006) have been declared regular, and the reasons for the conviction of Luciano Moggi are vague; mostly, they condemn his position, that he was in a position to commit a crime. In short, be careful to enter a shop without surveillance because even if you don't steal, you would have had the opportunity. And go on to explain to your friends that you're honest people after the morbid and pro-sales campaign of the newspapers." Rossini criticized some in the media, writing that "a club has been acquitted, and no one has heard of it, and whoever has heard of it, they don't accept it. The verdict of 2006, made in a hurry, was acceptable, that of Naples was not. The problem then lies not so much in vulgar journalism as in readers who accept the truths that are convenient. Juventus was, rightly or wrongly, the best justification for the failures of others, and it was in popular sentiment, as evidenced by the new controversies concerning 'The System.' But how? Wasn't the rotten erased?" About the latter, Rossini said that, according to Moratti, referees have been wrong in good faith since 2006, and stated that "it isn't a question of tifo, but of a critical spirit, of the desire to deepen and not be satisfied with the headlines (as did Oliviero Beha, a well-known Viola [Fiorentina] fan, who, however, drew conclusions outside the chorus because, despite enjoying it as a tifoso, he suffered as a journalist. He wasn't satisfied and went into depth. He was one of the few)."

In 2015, journalist Giuliano Vaciago wrote: "The first instance ruling of Casoria and the famous Palazzi report (the one in which the public prosecutor of the FIGC considers Inter Milan liable to sporting offences in light of the new interceptions) would be enough to appear in front of the FIGC and reopen the 2006 folders. There's no need to reopen the sentences of the Supreme Court to rewrite history, just read well the first instance one and listen to the trial that produced it. And nothing remains of the sporting trial." In response to former Juventus' player Alessandro Del Piero, who dubbed Calciopoli as "[a] bit crazy and unusual, strange from many points of view", journalist Marcello Chirico stated that "Del Piero is right to be amazed again, even 14 years later. Something anomalous happened that summer, and the anomaly was also perpetrated in the years to come with the ordinary process and subsequent appeals. The most compromising phone calls with the [referee] designators (authorized by the system of the time, it's always good to remember) were made by other clubs, and not by Juve. It's all documented. However, Juventus was sent to Serie B all the same and someone else, who explicitly asked to be able to win a match and pilot the referee draw, received a scudetto as a gift. All this is also documented through very explicit phone call records." Journalist Roberto Renga, who was also active as a journalist during the Totonero scandal in the 1980s, sees Calciopoli as an injustice, in regards to Juventus' treatment. In 2018, he commented: "As you know, I'm not a Juventus fan, but I'm a football fan, of teams that work and do well. And I get attached to those who have suffered abuse."

 Defendants and referees 
Moggi always declared himself innocent, and in his appeals to the European courts stated that "if they give me a pardon, I renounce it. Pardon is for those who are guilty, I'm not guilty [of the 'criminal association' charge], I didn't do anything [criminal]. They weren't angry at me, they were angry at Juventus because it won too much." About those who said his declarations of innocence were based on the view that everyone was guilty, he clarified: "I have never said that everyone is guilty and therefore there is no one to blame. There is a practice, you have to ban Carraro when he says in wiretaps that you have to save Fiorentina and Lazio." About his actions, Moggi stated that they were criticizable, and he was wrong from an ethical standpoint but did not commit any illicit; Moggi said that "[t]he sports court, at the end of the trial, ruled as follows: 'Regular championship, no match altered.' Therefore Juventus [is] exempt from crimes referred to in Art. 6. The final ruling of the ordinary justice instead spoke of 'early consummation' crimes, which are nothing more than the fruit of hypotheses and inferences of that prosecutor who in the courtroom had asserted 'there were no other phone calls, if not those of the suspects in the trial', while the [Italian Football] Federation Prosecutor asserted that 'Inter Milan was the club that risked most of all for the illegal behavior of its President Facchetti." About the Swiss sim cards, Moggi stated that he used them to circumvent "those [such as Inter Milan and Inter Milan's Telecom] who intercepted us", with reference to transfer operations. He commented: "We had bought Stanković and we also had the contract ready to be presented to the [Italian Football] Federation. After two months the player and his agent disappeared, we found them at Inter Milan." About the wiretaps, Moggi said that he never intruded on the designation of referees, and spoke of incomplete wiretaps for the prosecution. Moggi also reiterated that "[t]hey accused me of going to the referees' locker room but that's not true; others did. Paparesta's kidnapping never happened, it was just a joke." In 2014, Agnelli stated: "Moggi represents a beautiful and important part of our history. We are the country of Catholicism and forgiveness. We can also forgive people, can't we?" Moggi responded: "Nice words. I thank Andrea Agnelli, but I don't need forgiveness. If anything, I deserve praise for [the 16 trophies won on the pitch for the club]. ... There were twenty clubs and they behaved in the same way but only Juve paid because it bothered."

The defendants implicated with Moggi were stunned by the charges and conviction of criminal association. Of the alleged seven-consecutive falsified championship, they mentioned that Juventus controversially lost out two, both of which were consecutively won for the first time in Italian football history by two Southern clubs (the first by Lazio in 2000 during the Jubilee in the Catholic Church, and the second by Roma during the Passaportopoli scandal, which did not involve Juventus, upset that rules were changed and not respected), and only won another championship (that of 5 May 2002) due to what was called "Inter Milan's [football] suicide". Bergamo, one of the referee designators implicated, stated: "But I talked to everyone, that's what [then-FIGC president] Carraro wanted. And I dined with everyone: with the late Franco Sensi, with Tanzi and Sacchi, with Spalletti, Spinelli, [and] Aliberti. Then I invite home Facchetti, Galliani, and those of Juve, when the championship is now over but only with the Bianconeri do I find myself at home surrounded by the Carabinieri, the photo stalking, [and] the wiretapping. Yet the invitation to Facchetti and Galliani I did by phone! Nothing, nothing comes back to me in this investigation and its shortcomings; my wife used the Swiss [phone] card. With Nucini's fabrication of history: he meets Moggi, he becomes a partner, and we no longer put him in Serie A. There was no [criminal] affiliation: he was [simply] mediocre!" Like fellow referees Pierluigi Collina and Roberto Rosetti, Paolo Tagliavento stated to have never received any pressure, and testified: "I was never pressured by the [referee] designator or De Santis. For a referee it's easier to reff a derby than being in a courtroom, I'm not at ease here."

Former referee and defendant De Santis, convicted of criminal association as a simple associate with Moggi, was also upset by the rulings, and feel that Italian football is no better today than it was at that time. De Santis recalled that he was called a juventino for disallowing Fabio Cannavaro's regular goal in a Juventus–Parma match of the 1999–00 Serie A that was won by the former 1–0, for which he made mea culpa and stated it was one of many honest, good-faith mistakes in his career, which he realized upon re-watching the events, but that he was never a Juventus supporter, and he was not favoured by Moggi. De Santis felt that he was the sole referee to pay, as he was the only convicted referee, and stated: "The 2004–2005 championship was regular. The sentences are clear: no match [was] altered. All the referees were acquitted. The only three matches that ended up as 'fixed' have never been tried but only theorized. There were flaws that neither the Court of Appeal nor that of Cassation wanted to discover, [only] following the initial theory [of Moggi's criminal association] instead of seeking the truth. I have never had any [Swiss SIM], I have proved it in the documentation presented to the trials. Am I the only referee who has not freed myself from the shoals of the prosecution? At first, I was seen as a promoter of the association, then only as a simple associate. It was necessary to ascertain the truth, not to frame people in a theorem that is the child of the Pirelli files."

About Berlusconi, Moggi said: "I thanked him and I thank him for his esteem for me, maybe I reserve him a criticism for what he didn't do to the Calciopoli explosion: he knew that innocent people would be penalized, obviously for him too it was a priority to demolish Juventus' domain." Moggi also said that Berlusconi wanted him at Milan, and during a private meeting to discuss the matter revealed to him that "the FIGC possessed some of [Moggi's] wiretaps without any criminal value, of which Galliani (then-vice-president of Milan and president of Lega Calcio), Carraro (then-president of the FIGC), [and] General Pappa, head of the investigations office of the FIGC, were also aware." Moggi stated that those same wiretaps were made public just a few days after. Moggi had earlier said that Galliani made Calciopoli come out because Berlusconi wanted him at Milan. In regard to the dispute between the FIGC and Juventus, Moggi responded to then-FIGC president Carlo Tavecchio: "From the trials, it turns out that there has been no alteration of the championship, there has been no alteration of the referee grids, even 30 referees were acquitted of the charges. I've helped some of these acquitted referees, I've helped many financially. Poor boys, I felt sorry for them, they didn't know how to pay the lawyer. They were ruined by Calciopoli." About the Supreme Court's sentence, Moggi reiterated his innocence of the criminal association charge, and added: "The Supreme Court speaks of power. But power isn't a crime. I had power because I worked well, it was power because of the quality of the work [as general director] I did." Apart from Milan, Moggi stated that he was also sought by Inter Milan. Citing Gianni Agnelli's quote that "the king's groom must have known all the horse thieves", Moggi discussed how "Agnelli said that because during my time it was full of sons of bitches. And he wanted an expert, one who could stand up to these here. For me it's a compliment."

In 2017, Moggi said that "VAR was supposed to be the end of the controversy, [but] nothing has changed. Calciopoli would have broken out anyway. Five referees were acquitted, Racalbuto had the statute of limitation, and only De Santis was convicted; as the rulings say, the matches and the leagues have not been altered. What happened on the pitch was just a pretext used to take out those who at that moment had the most skills and obtained the most successes." When Agnelli, among others, was investigated by the public prosecutor's office of Turin on the management of tickets at the Juventus Stadium about the alleged infiltration of the 'Ndrangheta in the commercial management of the club's tickets, Moggi stated: "For those who know Andrea, it's an accusation that would make people laugh rather than cry, [which was] bounced on all the newspapers despite the denials of the Federal Prosecutor, Giuseppe Pecoraro. Juve is again under attack from those who can't beat them on the pitch. What happened in 2006 wasn't enough." By March 2020, both Moggi and Giraudo appealed to the European Court of Human Rights for the conduct of the trials and the few time given to legal defences; Giraudo's appeal was accepted in September 2021, and he is being represented by Amedeo Rosboch, the same lawyer who defended Jean-Marc Bosman in the revolutionary Bosman ruling in association football.

 FIGC–Inter Milan–Juventus controversy 
 Inter Milan and Juventus 
Before later developments and investigation implicated Inter Milan, among other clubs, Inter Milan felt vindicated by the trial's first phase, as in their view that was the reason why the club did not win in Italy, having at that time most recently won the 1988–89 Serie A championship. Upon being assigned the 2006 scudetto, Inter Milan and their supporters called it scudetto degli onesti ("scudetto of the honests"). With Juventus' relegation, Inter Milan boasted of becoming the only Serie A club to have never been relegated. Then-Inter Milan owner Massimo Moratti would later state that he did not disdain the 2006 scudetto, as he thought it was just; of the five consecutive championship won by Inter Milan between 2006 and 2010, Moratti stated that the 2006 title was "the most beautiful", and he was proud of it. In response to Moratti's statements, Juventus president Andrea Agnelli stated: "It must be recognized he has a great love for Inter Milan, a great love that led him to accept some follies such as accepting a scudetto that he didn't win." In spite of the diatribe, when expressing satisfaction at the 2015 Supreme Court ruling, Moratti also stated that he was always friend with Agnelli. Despite more cordiality outside football between the Agnelli family and the Moratti family, relations remain damaged by Calciopoli, and the football rivalry increased. Dating back to the 1960s, it represented the battle of oil manufacturer Pirelli and automobile manufacturer FIAT, Milan versus Turin as the battle of the Italian triangle industrial north, and an intra-capitalist conflict. Calciopoli only strengthened the rivalry, and the Derby d'Italia became even bigger than Milan's Derby della Madonnina, or the Juventus–Milan rivalry in the 1990s and early 2000s. In 2013, Moratti was succeeded as president by Indonesian businessman Erick Thohir, to whom he sold all his stakes. Relations did not improve, as Juventus continued to appeal and ask for the revision of the proceedings, all the while former Inter Milan board of director and then-FIGC president Carlo Tavecchio's declared sympathy for Inter Milan surfaced, amid photos with Inter Milan's executives and future Chinese ownership. Relations between the two clubs only improved in 2018, as Zhang Kangyang, the son of new Chinese owner Zhang Jindong through the Suning Holdings Group, became Inter Milan president. In 2021, Juventus and Inter Milan were two of three Italian clubs (the other was Milan) to take part to the European Super League project.

Some Inter Milan players, such as Julio Cruz, Ronaldo, and long-time captain Javier Zanetti, felt vindicated by the rulings but said that Juventus was among the best teams. Alvaro Recoba and Christian Vieri were one of the few Inter Milan players who did not feel the 2006 scudetto as theirs, stating that Juventus was the better team, and the 2006 scudetto belonged to Juventus. In a 2012 interview, Recoba stated: "For my part, I think that Juventus won that scudetto because they had great players and ... [w]hen it turned out that the scudetto was awarded to Inter Milan, I thought the players didn't feel it was theirs." Then-Juventus captain Alessandro Del Piero, who testified that "referee De Santis didn't penalize Ibra[himovic] but was later disqualified with the TV proof for a foul on Cordoba and missed the championship match with Milan", and there was general agreement to play the contested Lecce–Juventus match, stated to have won 17 titles, not 15. He commented: "All the scudetti won since I have played football have been deserved, be it those of our club or others. At the time, Juve was a very strong team built to win." In 2019, Fabio Capello, Juventus coach from 2004 to 2006, stated: "It seems right to me [that Juventus appealed to the 2006 decision], it's funny that it was assigned to Inter Milan, which finished third and was also under investigation. Guido Rossi decided very hastily because we needed a team that would play in the Champions League. It was unfair, the rules weren't respected, and sports justice couldn't investigate thoroughly."

About the scandal and subsequent trials, Agnelli said: "In 2006, the problem was equal treatment. In a circle of twenty clubs there was a way of behaving that emerged from the proceedings, but now the Juventus fan thinks he was the only one to pay because the others did the same things. And those [like Inter Milan] who have behaved in the same way can't go out with a scudetto in their pocket. We can't forget about all this. In Naples there're two criminal proceedings that are coming to an end, then there will be other degrees of judgment, but the court papers give an idea of what happened. When the whole process is completed, we will make a decision. Certainly, however, it makes no sense to speak of a statute of limitation if new facts emerge in the meantime." In 2018, Giovanni Cobolli Gigli, who became Juventus president after the scandal, stated that Inter Milan "deserved to be punished" for Calciopoli, and expressed regrets for the sporting trials, about which he said: "We were demoted to play the 2006–07 season in Serie B and accepted the ruling. The regret remains for a sporting trial that was, in my view, not conducted in the best way. Certain pieces of evidence were ignored, actually it's more accurate to say hidden, and the existence of other telephone wiretaps regarding different clubs wasn't made known at the time. Inter [Milan] too deserved to be punished for what emerged in the various conversations. The FIGC Prosecutor Palazzi said so. It all emerged when the matter missed the statute of limitations and it ended like that."

The diatribe between Moratti and Moggi never ended, and continues to this day. In 2020, Moratti said: "Everything served to create the conditions to triumph, even the misadventures due to having to face a Juve who behaved as they did and fight against a wall that seemed unshakable. Then we managed to break through it, and thus find those satisfactions in which I had always believed but which at a certain point seemed impossible." Moggi recalled a sentence of the Court of Appeal stating that Inter Milan's Facchetti lobbied with the referees, and Palazzi, the federal prosecutor of the time, wrote that Inter Milan was the club that risked most of all, adding: "Moratti has lost another opportunity to shut up. He could celebrate in another way, and maybe those who asked him could ask him if one ruling counts more than another or if the law is really the same for everyone." Appealing to the code, Moggi stated: "Inter Milan was liable for Article 6, which is a sporting offence, Juventus was never liable for Article 6. It's good to remind the gentleman because nobody ever speaks for Juventus, so I do it. There're wiretaps in which Facchetti and Moratti ask a referee to let them win the match, I have never done these things."

 Juventus' appeals and damage claims 
After Calciopoli bis implicated almost every Serie A club and the Court of Appeal confirmed the extraneousness of Juventus, the club asked the two championships back in 2011 and sued the FIGC over €443 million in damage claims, updated to €581 million by 2016, due to being unable to participate UEFA competitions, major money loss from TV rights, as the club was relegated to Serie B, and had to sell major players at cheap prizes. Observers, such as Fulvio Bianchi, said that at that time "Juventus was ... stronger than all those that came after, and had €250 million in revenue, being at the top of Europe, and 100 sponsors. It took ten years to recover and return to the top Italians, not yet Europeans: now the club makes over €300 million, but in the meantime Real, Bayern, and the others have taken off."

In 2015, Carlo Tavecchio, a former Inter Milan's board of director member for four years and former FIGC president from 2014 to 2017, admitted, "as a good, old interista", that "Juventus was clearly the strongest team on the pitch, they won 32 championships: the team didn't steal anything." He expressed frustration at the club's repeated appeals and damage claims to the FIGC, which he described as absurd, and added that "Juve's cause is reckless and, you will see, the FIGC will ask for damages." Tavecchio, who in later years stated to be in good relations with Agnelli and Juventus despite the multimillion-dollar lawsuit, offered to discuss reinstatement of the lost scudetti, as well as reforms in Italian football, in exchange for Juventus dropping the lawsuit. The diatribe between the FIGC and Juventus intensified when Juventus won the club's first championship since the scandal, and continued to add, on both its website and stadium, the two championships from 2005 and 2006 during the club's record streak of nine-consecutive league titles; this caused some skirmishes between the FIGC and Juventus when Italy football team had to play at the Juventus Stadium, and the club's number of scudetti had to be covered. About the incident, Tavecchio stated that "the Calciopoli ruling, which sanctioned the club's behavior off the pitch, is law and we are here to enforce it."

 In popular culture 
The vicissitudes of Calciopoli have found ample space in the national and international mass media, influencing the popular imagination and acting as the subject for various types of audiovisual productions. In summer 2006, comedian Checco Zalone released the song "Siamo una squadra fortissimi" ("We are a very strong team"), a tribute to the Italian national team in the FIFA World Cup in Germany. In the same year, Zalone recorded the song "I juventini" about Juventus' relegation to Serie B. In 2009, the documentary film Operation Off Side was released about the investigations by the Carabinieri between 2004 and 2005, while the documentary Nel paese di Giralaruota: il grande inganno di Calciopoli and the comic series Forza Italia recount the various part of the scandal. In 2013, the Rai 3 criminological program Un giorno in pretura showed the depositions provided by prosecution witnesses in the Naples criminal trial and explored the various strands of the investigations that then led to the proceedings. In 2021, a chapter of the Netflix series Il lato oscuro dello sport is focused on the Calciopoli investigation from the prosecutor's side. The following year, the documentary Calciopoli – Anatomia di un processo, where the stages of the investigations and the criminal trial in Naples are recalled, was available through Italy's History channel from the prosecutor's side and focused in the sporting trials.

The scandal was instrumental in coining and popularize several neologisms, such as Farsopoli (by critics of the trials), scudetto degli onesti (by Inter Milan supporters upon being assigned the 2006 scudetto), scudetto di cartone (by critics of the title assignment's to Inter Milan), Rubentus, and prescritti. The former was coined by supporters of the trials in reference to Juventus' involvement in the scandal, while the latter is used by critics of the trials in reference to Inter Milan's involvement in the scandal, and the club's other scandals resulting, like Calciopoli and accounting fraud investigations, in the statute of limitation. Antijuventino and antijuventinità, terms used to describe Juventus' hatred, which intensified during those years, were also popularized. Both of those terms are included in Treccanis website as neologisms; in addition, the period after Calciopoli is termed post-Calciopoli.

 Explanatory notes, quotes, and wiretaps 

 References 

 Bibliography 
 English 
 2000s 

 
 
 
 
 
 
 
 
 
 
 
 
 
 
 
 
 
 
 
 
 
 
 
 .
 
 
 
 
 
 
 

 2010s 

 
 
 
 
 
 
 
 
 
 
 
 
 
 
 
 
 
 
 
 
 
 
 
 
 
 
 
 
 
 
 
 
 
 

 2020s 

 
 
 
 
 
 
 
 

 Italian 
 2000s 

 
 
 
 
 
 
 
 .
 
 
 
 
 
 
 
 
 
 
 
 
 
 
 
 
 
 
 
 
 
 
 
 
 
 
 
 
 
 
 
 
 
 
 
 
 
 .
 
 
 
 
 
 
 
 
 
 
 
 
 
 
 
 
 
 
 
 
 
 
 
 
 
 
 
 
 
 
 
 
 
 
 
 

 2010s 

 
 
 
 
 
 
 
 
 
 
 
 .
 .
 .
 .
 .
 
 
 
 
 
 .
 
 
 
 
 
 
 
 
 
 
 
 
 
 
 
 
 
 
 
 
 
 
 
 
 
 
 
 
 
 
 
 
 
 
 
 
 
 
 
 
 
 
 
 
 
 
 
 
 
 
 
 
 
 
 
 
 
 
 
 
 
 
 
 
 
 
 
 
 
 
 
 
 
 
 
 
 
 
 
 
 
 
 
 
 
 
 
 
 
 
 
 
 
 
 
 
 
 
 
 
 
 
 
 
 
 
 
 
 
 
 
 
 
 
 
 
 
 
 
 
 
 
 
 
 
 
 
 
 
 
 
 
 
 
 
 
 
 
 
 
 
 .
 .
 
 
 
 
 
 
 
 
 
 
 
 
 
 
 
 
 
 
 
 
 
 
 
 
 
 
 
 
 
 
 
 
 
 
 
 
 
 
 
 
 
 
 
 
 
 
 
 
 
 
 
 
 
 
 
 
 .
 .
 
 
 
 
 
 
 
 
 
 
 
 
 

 2020s 

 
 
 
 
 
 
 
 
 
 
 
 
 
 
 
 
 
 
 
 
 
 
 
 
 
 
 
 
 
 
 
 
 
 
 
 
 
 
 
 
 
 
 
 
 
 
 
 
 
 
 
 
 
 
 
 
 
 
 
 
 
 
 
 
 
 

 Previous scandals and controversies 

 
 
 
 
 
 
 
 
 
 
 
 
 
 
 
 
 
 
 
 
 
 
 
 
 
 
 
 
 
 
 
 
 
 
 
 
 
 
 
 
 
 
 
 
 
 
 

 Previous and subsequent controversies 

 
 
 
 
 
 
 
 
 
 
 
 
 
 
 
 
 
 
 
 
 
 
 
 
 
 
 
 
 
 
 
 
 
 
 
 
 
 
 
 
 
 
 
 
 
 
 
 
 
 
 

 Further reading 
 
 
 
 
 

 External links 

 Complete rulings
 Complete record of the FIGC decision, July 2006 (in Italian) – via La Gazzetta dello Sport Complete record of the FIGC decision, June 2011 (in Italian) – via the FIGC website
 Complete sentence for the November 2011 trial written by the Naples court (in Italian) – via La Gazzetta dello Sport Complete sentence for the March 2015 trial written by the Supreme Court (in Italian) – via Rivista di Diritto ed Economia dello Sport''

 Reports
 BBC Sport article on the history of similar scandals (in English)
 Calcio Blog summary (in Italian)
 The Guardian report (in English)
 Sprint e Sport article on the history of similar scandals (in Italian)
 The Sunday Business Post report (in English)

 Websites
 Analysis on the controversies surrounding the scandal (in English)
 Daily-Calcio.com May 2006 news (in English)
 Italian website analyzing the scandal (in Italian)
 Juventus' minority shareholders website with documents and analysis on the scandal (in Italian)
 Penalties and point-deductions in Italian football history (in Italian)

2005–06 in Italian football
2006–07 in Italian football
2006 scandals
Association football controversies
History of football in Italy
Sports scandals in Italy